Kiin Kiin (Thai: "come and eat") is a Danish restaurant serving Thai cuisine, located in Guldbergsgade at Nørrebro in Copenhagen. It is one of the few Thai restaurants in the world to receive a Michelin star. It was opened in 2005 by Henrik Yde-Andersen and Lertchai Treetawatchaiwong. Dak Wichangoen is the head-chef of the restaurant.

See also
 List of Thai restaurants

References

Restaurants in Denmark
Companies based in Copenhagen
Thai restaurants
Thai diaspora in Europe
Companies based in Copenhagen Municipality